Lloyd Harris may refer to:

 Lloyd Harris (politician) (1867–1925), businessman and political figure in Ontario, Canada
 Lloyd Harris (tennis) (born 1997), South African tennis player